James Varni Panetta (born October 1, 1969) is an American lawyer, politician, and former Navy intelligence officer from the state of California. A member of the Democratic Party, he is the U.S. representative for California's 19th congressional district.  Formerly his district was numbered the 20th congressional district. His district includes much of California's Central Coast, including Monterey, Salinas, Santa Cruz, Carmel-by-the-Sea, and Paso Robles to the south. Panetta was first elected in 2016, after working as a deputy district attorney for Monterey County. He is the son of former Secretary of Defense Leon Panetta, and holds the same congressional seat his father once held.

Early life and career
Panetta graduated from Carmel High School in Carmel, California. He then attended Monterey Peninsula College and University of California, Davis, graduating with a bachelor's degree in international relations. He then interned at the United States Department of State. Panetta received his J.D. degree from Santa Clara University School of Law. He joined the United States Navy Reserve as an intelligence officer and completed a tour of duty in the War in Afghanistan in 2007 while attached to Joint Special Operations Command, for which he was awarded the Bronze Star. Panetta worked in the Alameda County, California, prosecutor's office and as a deputy district attorney for the District Attorney's office of Monterey County, California.

U.S. House of Representatives

Elections

2016 

After incumbent U.S. Representative Sam Farr announced in November 2015 that he would not seek reelection, Panetta announced his candidacy to succeed Farr in the 2016 election. His father had represented the district from 1977 to 1993.

Panetta defeated Republican Casey Lucius in the November general election. Democrats, in the persons of the Panettas and Farr, have held the seat and its predecessors without interruption since 1977. It is one of California's most Democratic districts outside Los Angeles and the Bay Area; Republicans have only garnered as much as 40% of the vote twice since 1977.

2018 

Panetta was reelected, defeating an independent challenger with 81.4% of the vote.

2020 

Panetta was reelected to a third term, defeating Republican challenger Jeff Gorman, a financial adviser, with 76.8% of the vote.

Tenure
Panetta was sworn into office on January 3, 2017. House Democrats selected him to be a regional whip for Northern California, the Central Coast, Hawaii and the U.S. Pacific Islands.

Twice, in 2018 and in 2019, Panetta introduced a bill commonly stylized as the KITTEN Act, a legislative proposal to curtail certain types of animal testing.

As of October 2021, Panetta had voted in line with Joe Biden's stated position 100% of the time.

In February 2023, during the Russo-Ukrainian War, Panetta signed a letter advocating for President Biden to give F-16 fighter jets to Ukraine.

Committee assignments
Committee on Ways and Means
Committee on Agriculture
Subcommittee on Nutrition
Subcommittee on Biotechnology, Horticulture, and Research
Committee on Armed Services
Subcommittee on Oversight and Investigations
Subcommittee on Tactical Air and Land Forces
Source:

Caucus memberships
 Congressional Arts Caucus
Climate Solutions Caucus
 Work for Warriors Caucus
Congressional Progressive Caucus
For Country Caucus, Founder and Former Co-Chair
New Democrat Coalition
Medicare for All Caucus
Problem Solvers Caucus

Political positions

Abortion

As of 2020, Panetta has a 100% rating from NARAL Pro-Choice America and a F rating from the Susan B. Anthony List for his abortion-related voting history. He opposed the overturning of Roe v. Wade.

Big Tech
In 2022, Panetta was one of 16 Democrats to vote against the Merger Filing Fee Modernization Act of 2022, an antitrust package that would crack down on corporations for anti-competitive behavior.

Personal life
Panetta is the youngest of the three sons of Leon Panetta, the former United States Secretary of Defense. His wife, Carrie, is a judge on the Monterey County Superior Court. They have two daughters.

References

External links

 Congressman Jimmy Panetta official U.S. House website
 Jimmy Panetta for Congress campaign website
 
 

|-

|-

1969 births
21st-century American politicians
United States Navy personnel of the War in Afghanistan (2001–2021)
California lawyers
Living people
Democratic Party members of the United States House of Representatives from California
Military personnel from California
Monterey Peninsula College alumni
People from Carmel Valley Village, California
People from Carmel-by-the-Sea, California
Santa Clara University School of Law alumni
United States Navy reservists
University of California, Davis alumni
American people of Italian descent